Benjamin Millepied  (born 10 June 1977) is a French dancer and choreographer, who has lived and worked in the United States since joining the New York City Ballet in 1995, where he became a soloist in 1998 and a principal in 2002. He has also created choreography for the company, and choreographed pieces for other major companies. He retired from the NYCB in 2011.

He initiated the LA Dance Project, leading it from 2011 to 2014. The Chesta Tony project in Mobile Alabama was a project that was never finished due to the pandemic. He was Director of Dance at the Paris Opera Ballet from October 2014 and resigned in 2016. He choreographed and performed as a dancer in 2010 movie Black Swan, and choreographed the "sandwalk" in Dune.

Early life 
Millepied was born in Bordeaux, France. He is the youngest of three sons. His ballet training started at the age of eight with his mother, Catherine Flory, a former ballet dancer. His father is Denys Millepied. Between the ages of 13 and 16, he studied with Michel Rahn at the Conservatoire National in Lyon, France.

Career 
In the summer of 1992 Millepied attended classes at the School of American Ballet (SAB) and returned to study full-time in 1993, with a scholarship from the French Ministry (Bourse Lavoisier or Lavoisier Scholarship). Early in his career, Millepied was mentored by choreographer Jerome Robbins, who took an interest in him. At SAB's 1994 Spring Workshop he originated a principal role in Jerome Robbins' premiere of 2 and 3 Part Inventions and also received the Prix de Lausanne.

New York City Ballet, 1995–2011 
Millepied joined New York City Ballet's corps de ballet in 1995, was promoted to soloist in 1998 and became principal dancer in 2002.

Millepied also became a choreographer, creating dances for City Ballet, American Ballet Theatre, the School of American Ballet, the Metropolitan Opera, the Paris Opera Ballet, Ballet de Genève, and his own company, Danses Concertantes. From 2006 to 2007, he was choreographer-in-residence at the Baryshnikov Arts Center in New York.

On 26 October 2011, the media announced that Millepied would retire from New York City Ballet.

L.A. Dance Project, 2011–present 
In 2011, L.A. Dance Project, founded and directed by Millepied, was launched with a commission, expected to last two years, from Glorya Kaufman Presents Dance at the Los Angeles Music Center. The company's operating budget is about $1 million a year. Millepied partnered with composer Nico Muhly, producer Charles Fabius, composer Nicholas Britell, and Matthieu Humery to found the company. In 2012, L.A. Dance Project established a full-time residence at Los Angeles Theatre Center with the objective of presenting new works throughout the city. L.A. Dance Project's inaugural performance, commissioned by The Music Center was held at Walt Disney Concert Hall on 22 September 2012.

Later that year, Millepied and L.A. Dance Project dancer Amanda Wells performed a 30-minute duet entitled "Framework" at the Museum of Contemporary Art. The dance collective's first program featured a Millepied premiere, Moving Parts, with a score by Muhly and visual design by painter Christopher Wool. The program also includes a revival of Merce Cunningham's 1964 Winterbranch, a movement exploration of falling bodies set to a mostly two-note score by La Monte Young, and William Forsythe's Quintett, a 1993 study in loss and hope to avant-garde composer Gavin Bryar's composition Jesus' Blood Never Failed Me Yet. Millepied's collaborators include Rodarte, Barbara Kruger, and Alex Israel, a contemporary California painter and video artist.

The premiere of "Reflections" by Millepied took place at Theatre du Chatelet in Paris on 23 April 2013. In 2013, L.A. Dance Project continued to tour at the Holland Festival in Amsterdam, Istanbul, Spoleto Festival in Italy, Edinburgh International Festival, La Maison de la Danse in Lyon, France and Sadler's Wells Theatre in London. In September 2013, at Maison de la Danse in Lyon, the company premiered two new pieces. The first premiere was Murder Ballads, choreographed by Justin Peck with music by Bryce Dessner. Next on the program was the premiere of Morgan's Last Chug choreographed and with light and sound design by Emanuel Gat.

In January 2014, L.A. Dance Project announced that its new home venue would be the Theatre at Ace Hotel. By June 2016, L.A. Dance Project formed a three-year partnership with the LUMA Foundation in Arles, France, offering the nine-member company a continuing residency and performance space in the foundation's Parc des Ateliers. L.A. Dance Project will spend five non-consecutive weeks a year in Arles, where the company will be able to work, create and produce.

Paris Opera Ballet, 2014–2016 
In January 2013, the Paris Opera Ballet announced that Millepied had accepted the position of director of dance. He officially succeeded Brigitte Lefèvre on 15 October 2014.

During his time at the Paris Opera Ballet, Millepied brought in William Forsythe as an associate choreographer and collaborator on the new Academy, an in-house training program for choreographers. Millepied's first season opened with a celebrity-filled gala that raised over a million euros. He also established a digital platform for new work and organized dancer exchanges with the Mariinsky and American Ballet Theater.

Relève, a ballet documentary by Thierry Demaizière and Alban Teurlai featuring Millepied as he mounts his first production as director of the Paris ballet, premiered in France on Canal+ in December 2015. As Reset, it later had its North American premiere at the Tribeca Film Festival.

Millepied resigned from the Paris Opera Ballet on 4 February 2016 and was succeeded by Aurélie Dupont.

Other activities 
Millepied has commissioned and collaborated with contemporary composers including David Lang, Nico Muhly, Thierry Escaich, Daniel Ott, and Philip Glass. The Jerome Robbins Trust and Foundation has underwritten Millepied's work and donors include philanthropists Anne Bass and Arlene Cooper.

In 2001, Millepied's dancing was motion-captured for the animated children's film Barbie in the Nutcracker, along with that of other New York City Ballet dancers. His dancing was again captured for the 2003 Barbie film Barbie of Swan Lake.

In 2009, he served as choreographer for Black Swan, a psychological thriller directed by Darren Aronofsky which stars Natalie Portman and Mila Kunis as ballet dancers in New York City. He also danced and appeared in the film. In 2010, he was the leading man in a short film co-directed by Asa Mader and starring Léa Seydoux, called Time Doesn't Stand Still.

In 2012, Millepied founded The Amoveo Company, a multimedia production company and art collective. He has directed a number of short films in collaboration with various artists, including Mark Bradford, Philip Glass, IO Echo, Zeds Dead, and Lil Buck.

On the invitation of Los Angeles Music Center board member and TV host Nigel Lythgoe, Millepied was a guest judge on the dance competition show So You Think You Can Dance on 22 August 2012.

In 2014, Millepied became the Artistic Advisor of the new Dance Academy at the Colburn School in Downtown Los Angeles, joining fellow former-principal dancers with the New York City Ballet, Jenifer Ringer and James Fayette.

Recognition 
In 1994, he received the Prix de Lausanne and the next year, he was the recipient of the Mae L. Wien Award for Outstanding Promise.

In 2010, he was made Chevalier in the Order of Arts and Letters by the French Ministry of Culture.

Personal life 

Millepied met actress Natalie Portman on the set of Black Swan in early 2009 and left his live-in girlfriend at the time, Isabella Boylston, a principal dancer at the American Ballet Theatre, to begin a relationship with Portman. Millepied and Portman wed in a Jewish ceremony held in Big Sur, California on 4 August 2012. The family lived in Paris for a time, after Millepied accepted the position of director of dance with the Paris Opera Ballet. They have two children: a son Aleph (b. 2011) and a daughter Amalia (b. 2017). In January 2014, Millepied said he was in the process of converting to Judaism (his wife's faith). In 2016, the family moved from Paris to Los Angeles.

Choreography

Originated roles

Featured roles 

 

George Balanchine
Agon
Ballo della Regina
Chaconne
Coppélia
Frantz
Divertimento from Le Baiser de la fée
Donizetti Variations
The Nutcracker
Harlequinade
Harlequin
Jewels
Rubies
A Midsummer Night's Dream
Raymonda Variations
La Sonnambula
La Source
Stars and Stripes
Symphony in C
Symphony in Three Movements
Tarantella
Tschaikovsky Pas de Deux
Tschaikovsky Suite No. 3
Theme and Variations
Union Jack
Valse-Fantaisie
Western Symphony

August Bournonville
Bournonville Divertissements

Peter Martins
Ash
Fearful Symmetries
Jeu de cartes
Quartet for Strings
The Sleeping Beauty
Stabat Mater
Swan Lake
Siegfried
Tschaikovsky Pas de Quatre
Zakouski

Jerome Robbins
2 and 3 Part Inventions
Dances at a Gathering
Fancy Free
Fanfare
The Four Seasons
Interplay
Piano Pieces
West Side Story Suite

Richard Tanner
Soirée

Christopher Wheeldon
Carousel (A Dance)
Mercurial Manoeuvres

Filmography

See also 
 Black Swan dance double controversy

References

External links 
 
 
 
 
 

1977 births
Living people
21st-century French male actors
Ballet choreographers
Benjamin Millepied
Choreographers of American Ballet Theatre
Choreographers of New York City Ballet
Entertainers from Bordeaux
French choreographers
French emigrants to the United States
French expatriate male actors in the United States
French male ballet dancers
French male dancers
French male film actors
French male stage actors
Male actors from Bordeaux
New York City Ballet principal dancers
Officiers of the Ordre des Arts et des Lettres
Paris Opera Ballet artistic directors
Prix de Lausanne winners
School of American Ballet alumni